The San Francisco Bay National Estuarine Research Reserve (San Francisco Bay NERR) is one of 27 reserves established as part of the United States  National Estuarine Research Reserve System. The reserve is used to promote San Francisco Bay wetlands and estuary research, education, and stewardship.

Organization
The reserve is a partnership between National Oceanic and Atmospheric Administration (NOAA), San Francisco State University, California State Parks, Solano Land Trust, and the San Francisco Bay Conservation and Development Commission.

Reserve sites
The San Francisco Bay NERR consists of two sites in the San Francisco Bay Area: 
Rush Ranch Open Space Preserve — , on the northern margin of Suisun Marsh, at the western foot of the Potrero Hills, in Solano County.
 China Camp State Park — ,  on the shore of San Pablo Bay near San Rafael in Marin County.

See also
 Estuarine

References

External links
Official San Francisco Bay National Estuarine Research Reserve (San Francisco Bay NERR) website
Map of San Francisco Bay NERR
NOAA National Estuarine Research Reserve System website: San Francisco Bay NERR webpage

Estuaries of California
National Estuarine Research Reserves of the United States
Nature reserves in California
Protected areas of Marin County, California
Protected areas of Solano County, California
San Francisco Bay
San Pablo Bay
Wetlands of the San Francisco Bay Area
Natural history of Marin County, California
Natural history of Solano County, California
San Francisco Bay Trail